Daguguguji is a Chinese author and internet personality who is also known by various names such as Fú lǒu mì、Zhāngdà chuí. He is frequently referred to by some of his readers as the literary master  and the grand master.

Works
Daguguguji initially gained the attention of Chinese netizens through his writings on electronics forums such as Hi!PDA and TGFC. Currently Sina Weibo is his main channel for publishing his writings, with topics ranging from cultural commentary to political satire. His works are marked by their use of Defamiliarization, often achieved by the use of local dialects and made-up words.

Influences
As of 2018, Daguguguji has reached more than three million followers on Sina Weibo, the Chinese equivalent of Twitter. His unique style of writing and his creation of new phrases have a wide influence among his readers and even the general public. The anti-nationalistic nature of some of his works has also gained attention from Chinese citizens who are dissatisfied with the political status quo in China. In 2016, he was criticized by Global Times, a pro-establishment news publication, for coining the world "little pink" to describe jingoistic young Chinese nationalists.

External links

大咕咕咕雞在豆瓣閱讀的專欄《人間動物園》
豆瓣網「人間動物園」小組（大咕咕咕雞擁躉的常用交流平台）

References 

Chinese political writers
Year of birth missing (living people)
Living people